Avik Bhattacharya (born 1976) is a professor at the Centre of Studies in Resources Engineering, Indian Institute of Technology Bombay, Mumbai, India. He has been  working in the field of radar polarimetry theory and applications for more than a decade. His main focuses on the use of synthetic aperture radar (SAR) data for land use classification, change detection and qualitative and quantitative biophysical and  geophysical information estimation.

Education
Bhattacharya received his M.Sc. degree in mathematics from Indian Institute of Technology Kharagpur, West Bengal, India, in 2000, and the Ph.D. degree in Indexing of Satellite Images Using Structural Information from jointly at the Department of Traitement et Interprétation des Images, Télécom Paris-Tech, Paris, France and INRIA, ARIANA Project Group, Sophia Antipolis, France in 2007.

Professional career
Bhattacharya joined the Centre of Studies in Resources Engineering, Indian Institute of Technology Bombay, in 2011, as an assistant professor. He has been the principal and co-principal investigator of numerous projects sponsored by the Department of Science and Technology (DST), Defense Research and Development Organization (DRDO), Indian Space Research Organization (ISRO) and GEOGLAM-JECAM SAR Inter-Comparison Experiment. He has authored several scientific publications in refereed international journals and conference proceedings

Bhattacharya is the editor-in-chief of the IEEE Geoscience and Remote Sensing Letters(GRSL). He is also the founding chairperson of the IEEE Geoscience and Remote Sensing Society (GRSS) Chapter, Bombay section, India.

Bhattacharya has also served as a visiting professor at the following institutes:
LISTIC – Polytech Annecy-Chambéry, Université Savoie-Mont Blanc, France (2018)
Instituto Gulich, National University of Córdoba, Argentina Space Agency (CONAE), Argentina, (2018)
Visiting Scientist at the Canadian Centre for Remote Sensing Ottawa, ON, Canada (2011)

Major Research Contributions 

Stochastic Distance Based Y4O Polarimetric SAR Decomposition (SDY4O)
This is a radar polarimetric decomposition technique based on the field of statistical information theory. Here a method is devised to estimate the polarization (OA) orientation angle from the full polarimetric SAR data using the Hellinger distance.
Adaptive General Four-Component Scattering Power Decomposition
In this method, one out of the two types of complex special unitary transformation matrices is identified and chosen
to transform a unitary rotated coherency matrix in real space based on the greatest value of degree of polarization (DOP) commonly termed as adaptive general four-component scattering power decomposition method (AG4U).
Sen4Rice – A cloud-based SAR processing pipeline with Google Earth Engine
Here a framework for monitoring and mapping of rice fields especially from rice cultivation regions of India using time-series of Sentinel-1 data is developed using the Google Earth Engine's cloud computing platform.

Other research
Other significant research includes development of various methods like relative de-correlation Measure in Polarimetric SAR decomposition
, decomposition algorithm development consisting (S-Ω) and Modified (m-χ) and  crop monitoring using machine learning. In past, Prof. Bhattacharya was also actively involved in study related to snow dynamics in Himalayas involving SAR data from satellites like RADARSAT-2.

Honors and awards 

 Australian Government Endeavor Executive Fellowship Award (2016)
 Young Faculty Award, Indian Institute of Technology Bombay (2011) 
 Visiting Scientist Fellowship at the Canadian National Laboratories (2008)

See also 

 Polarimetry
 Synthetic Aperture Radar
 Remote sensing
 Interferometric SAR
 Satellite crop monitoring
 Remote sensing (geology)

Selected bibliography

Articles

Books

References

External links

1976 births
Living people
Academic staff of IIT Bombay
IIT Kharagpur alumni
Télécom Paris alumni
Remote sensing professionals
People from Kharagpur